Balaghat is a city and a municipality in Balaghat district, in the state of Madhya Pradesh, India. It is the administrative headquarters of Balaghat District. Wainganga River flows beside the town.

Geography
It has an average elevation of 288 metres (944 feet).

Demographics

As of the 2011 Census of India, Balaghat had a population of 84,216.  Males constitute 51% of the population and females 49%.  11% of the population is under 6 years of age.

References

Further reading

 
Cities and towns in Balaghat district

sv:Balaghat (distrikt)